Eva Amador Guillén (Torrent, Valencia Province, 1957) is a Spanish politician who belongs to the People's Party (PP).

Married with three children, Amador qualified in information technology. She entered politics in 1991 when she was elected local councillor for her hometown of Torrent.

In 1993 she was elected to the Spanish Congress of Deputies representing Valencia region. She was re-elected in 1996 but did not stand at the 2000 election. In 2000 she was appointed delegate for the Generalitat Valenciana, the Valencian regional administration, to the central government. She then became director general of relationships between the Generalitat and the central government in November 2005.

References

1957 births
Living people
People from Horta Sud
Members of the 5th Congress of Deputies (Spain)
Members of the 6th Congress of Deputies (Spain)
Politicians from the Valencian Community
People's Party (Spain) politicians
20th-century Spanish women politicians
21st-century Spanish politicians
21st-century Spanish women politicians
20th-century Spanish women